Polyzonus is a genus of long-horned beetles. About 35 species have been described in this genus and they are distributed in the Indomalayan Realm. 

An incomplete and unverified list of species names described under the genus include:
 Polyzonus (Polyzonides) obtusus 
 Polyzonus (Striatopolyzonus) flavocinctus 
 Polyzonus (Striatopolyzonus) nitidicollis 
 Polyzonus (Striatopolyzonus) tetraspilotus 
 Polyzonus barclayi 
 Polyzonus bhumiboli 
 Polyzonus bizonatus 
 Polyzonus brevipes 
 Polyzonus coeruleus 
 Polyzonus deliensis 
 Polyzonus democraticus 
 Polyzonus drumonti 
 Polyzonus flavovirens 
 Polyzonus hartmanni 
 Polyzonus hefferni 
 Polyzonus inae 
 Polyzonus jaegeri 
 Polyzonus jakli 
 Polyzonus latefasciatus 
 Polyzonus laurae 
 Polyzonus pakxensis 
 Polyzonus prasinus 
 Polyzonus saigonensis 
 Polyzonus siamensis 
 Polyzonus sinensis 
 Polyzonus subtruncatu 
 Polyzonus trocolii 
 Polyzonus yunnanus

References 

Callichromatini
Cerambycidae genera